
Gmina Człopa is an urban-rural gmina (administrative district) in Wałcz County, West Pomeranian Voivodeship, in north-western Poland.

Villages
Apart from the town of Człopa, Gmina Człopa contains the villages and settlements of Brzeźniak, Bukowo, Czaplice, Dłusko, Drzonowo Wałeckie, Drzonowo ZR, Dzwonowo, Golin, Jaglice, Jagoda, Jeleni Róg, Jelenie, Krąpiel, Mielęcin, Miradź, Nałęcze, Orzeń, Pieczyska, Podgórze, Podlesie, Przelewice, Pustelnia, Rybakówka, Szczuczarz, Trzcinno, Trzebin, Wołowe Lasy, Załom and Zwierz.

Neighbouring gminas
Gmina Człopa is bordered by the gminas of Dobiegniew, Drawno, Krzyż Wielkopolski, Trzcianka, Tuczno, Wałcz and Wieleń.

References
Polish official population figures 2006

Czlopa
Wałcz County